Colias chlorocoma  is a butterfly in the family Pieridae found in  Transcaucasia, Turkey and Iran.

Taxonomy
Originally described as Colias chlorocoma Christoph, 1888. Röber considered C. chlorocoma to be an apparently very rare, local form of Colias libanotica- "C. chlorocoma Christ., from Southern Armenia (Kasikoparan), is presumably a local form of libanotica ; it is large, the ground-colour being greenish in the male, white in the female. Apparently very rare."
Treated as a species of Colias Fabricius, 1807 by Tuzov et al.

Grieshuber & Gerardo Lamas consider that C. chlorocoma is very closely related to and possibly conspecific with Colias sagartia but androconial spots are rare in chlorocoma and males have yellow spots in the marginal band. The flight, the biotopes, and the foodplants of the two taxa are identical. C. chlorocoma is rather variable, in particular the green wing pigmentation differs from population to population but is usually greenish-yellow, C. sagartia is greenish.

Oorschot, H. & Wagener, S. treat all the subspecies as junior synonyms

Subspecies
Colias chlorocoma chlorocoma (Turkey)
Colias chlorocoma aladagensis Verhulst, 1993 (Turkey)
Colias chlorocoma tkatschukovi O. Bang-Haas, 1936 (Armenia, Azerbaijan)
Colias chlorocoma wyatti Häuser & Schurian, 1978 (Iran)

References

Joseph T. Verhulst (English translation R. Leestmans, editing E. Benton and R. Leestmans), 2000 Les Colias du Globe translation Monograph of the genus Colias Keltern, Germany : Goecke & Evers

External links

Colias chlorocoma von J. Fuchs
Rusinsects
  Colias chlorocoma images at  Consortium for the Barcode of Life verso

chlorocoma
Butterflies of Asia
Butterflies described in 1888
Butterflies of Europe